Love at the Bottom of the Sea is the tenth studio album by American indie pop band The Magnetic Fields. It was released in the U.K. on March 5, 2012 by record label Domino and in the U.S. on March 6, 2012 by Merge.

Two singles, "Andrew in Drag" and "Quick!", were released from the album.

Recording 

The album was recorded by Stephin Merritt and Charles Newman at Bell Tree in Los Angeles; Mother West, Serious Business Records and Dubway Studios in New York; and Tiny Telephone in San Francisco.

It is the band's first release with Merge since 1999's 69 Love Songs. After releasing three albums relatively free of synthesizers as part of a "no-synth trilogy" (2004's i, 2008's Distortion, and 2010's Realism), Love at the Bottom of the Sea features the blend of acoustic and synthesized instruments that the band was known for in the 1990s. Stephin Merritt claims he took a fresh approach with the instrumentation, stating "Most of the synthesizers on the record didn't exist when we were last using synthesizers." All of the tracks on the album are between two minutes and three minutes long, with the closing track being the longest at two minutes and thirty-eight seconds.

Release 

Love at the Bottom of the Sea was released in the U.K. on March 5, 2012 by record label Domino and in the U.S. on March 6, 2012 by Merge.

Reception 

The reception from critics has been generally favorable, with the average critical score being a 68 out of 100 according to review aggregator website Metacritic.

Track listing

Personnel 

 The Magnetic Fields

 Stephin Merritt – lead vocals on tracks 2, 4, 6, 7, 8, 10, 13 and 15, keyboards, synthesizers, guitar
 Claudia Gonson – backing vocals, piano, percussion, tambourine
 Sam Davol – cello, flute
 John Woo – guitar, banjo
 Shirley Simms – lead vocals on tracks 1, 3, 5, 8, 9, 11, 12, and 14,  autoharp

 Additional personnel

 Pinky Weitzman – violin, viola, Stroh violin, musical saw
 Daniel Handler – accordion, organ
 Johnny Blood – tuba, flugelhorn, alto horn
 Randy Walker – vocals

References

External links 

 

2012 albums
Merge Records albums
The Magnetic Fields albums
Domino Recording Company albums